Mercedes is a U.S. city in Hidalgo County, Texas. The population was 15,570 at the 2010 census. It is part of the McAllen–Edinburg–Mission and Reynosa–McAllen metropolitan areas.

Geography

Mercedes is located in southeastern Hidalgo County at  (26.149315, –97.918675). It is bordered to the west by Weslaco and to the east, in Cameron County, by La Feria.

The Interstate 2/U.S. Route 83 freeway passes through the northern side of Mercedes, leading west  to McAllen and east  to Harlingen.

History

Mercedes is known as "The Queen City of the Valley" or "La Reina del Valle". Mercedes was founded September 15, 1907, by the American Rio Grande Land & Irrigation Company, and was incorporated March 8, 1909. It is one of the oldest towns in the Rio Grande Valley, and the city celebrated its centennial in 2007.

The city was located in Capisallo Pasture, part of Capisallo Ranch owned by Jim Welles. This location was known as the Pear Orchard because of the vast numbers of prickly pear cactus growing there at that time.

Some sources state that the original name given to the city was "Diaz" in honor of Porfirio Diaz, then president of Mexico. Later it was supposedly renamed "Mercedes Diaz" in honor of the president's wife, and from that, Mercedes became the Queen City. This story, however, is historically inaccurate, given that neither of Diaz's two wives were named Mercedes.

General Zachary Taylor's headquarters was to the southeast of Mercedes near the Rio Grande. There the old Rabb Ranch was famous for its stagecoach stop and landing for the riverboats carrying supplies to the settlements and military installations.

The old Toluca Ranch still stands east of the International Bridge at Progreso, the sister city to the south. This ranch was close to the river and a prized target for the bandidos during the days of Pancho Villa. It was built with many secret rooms and passages, and had heavy wooden shutters on the windows to protect its residents.

Demographics

2020 census

As of the 2020 United States census, there were 16,258 people, 4,834 households, and 3,726 families residing in the city.

2000 census
At the 2000 census, there were 13,649 people, 4,170 households and 3,348 families residing in the city. The population density was 1,591.2 per square mile (614.2/km). There were 5,455 housing units at an average density of 636.0 per square mile (245.5/km). The racial makeup of the city was 79.42% White, 0.36% African American, 0.89% Native American, 0.07% Asian, 0.01% Pacific Islander, 16.95% from other races, and 2.31% from two or more races. Hispanic or Latino of any race were 90.01% of the population.

There were 4,170 households, of which 41.1% had children under the age of 18 living with them, 54.7% were married couples living together, 21.4% had a female householder with no husband present, and 19.7% were non-families. 18.0% of all households were made up of individuals, and 11.4% had someone living alone who was 65 years of age or older. The average household size was 3.27 and the average family size was 3.75.

32.9% of the population were under the age of 18, 11.5% from 18 to 24, 22.8% from 25 to 44, 18.4% from 45 to 64, and 14.4% who were 65 years of age or older. The median age was 29 years. For every 100 females, there were 88.6 males. For every 100 females age 18 and over, there were 82.3 males.

The median household income was $23,064 and the median family income was $25,339. Males had a median income of $19,945 versus $18,387 for females. The per capita income for the city was $8,658. About 30.4% of families and 36.4% of the population were below the poverty line, including 49.4% of those under age 18 and 30.3% of those age 65 or over.

Shopping

The Rio Grande Valley Premium Outlets, owned by Chelsea Property Group which is a brand of Simon Property Group, opened in November 2006. The city is roughly the geographical center of the Rio Grande Valley urban agglomeration and is located on Interstate 2/U.S. Highway 83, which connects the major urban centers of McAllen, Brownsville and Harlingen. The city is located near a major Mexico–United States border crossing making it accessible to the growing middle class population of Nuevo León and Tamaulipas.

Government and infrastructure
The United States Postal Service operates the Mercedes Post Office.

Current elected city officials (2023):
Oscar Montoya, Mayor
Jacob Howell, Commissioner Place 1
Armando Garcia, Commissioner Place 2
Joe Martinez, Commissioner Place 3
Ruben Saldana, Commissioner Place 4
Alberto Perez, City Manager

Police department
Pedro Estrada, Chief of Police

Education
Mercedes is divided between two school districts: eastern Mercedes is in the Mercedes Independent School District, zoned to Mercedes High School, while western Mercedes is in the Weslaco Independent School District, zoned to Weslaco East High School

In addition, South Texas Independent School District, which is headquartered in Mercedes, serves magnet students in many Rio Grande Valley communities, including Mercedes.

The Science Academy of South Texas and South Texas High School for Health Professions, schools of STISD, are in Mercedes.

In 2015, the city joined other cities in south Texas in support of the newly formed University of Texas Rio Grande Valley by adopting a resolution declaring August 31 as UTRGV day. Also, they recognized the university by installing a boot with the university logos right across the municipal city hall.

Public libraries
Dr Hector P Garcia Library serves Mercedes.

Public arts

Mercedes is home to a unique public art project: there are 30 handcrafted  cowboy boots dispersed throughout the city, each painted with the insignia of different colleges from around the state, country and even Mexico. People who are passionate about their alma mater come from all over to take a picture with their boot.

Radio stations

These FM radio stations broadcast from Mercedes:

Notable people

 Natalia Anciso, artist and educator
 Rolando Hinojosa-Smith, author and professor of English
 Billy Gene Pemelton, Olympic pole vaulter (1964)
 Elida Reyna, Tejano musician
 Jeff Wentworth, state senator

Climate
The climate in this area is characterized by hot, humid summers and generally mild to cool winters.  According to the Köppen Climate Classification system, Mercedes has a humid subtropical climate, abbreviated "Cfa" on climate maps.

References

External links
 City of Mercedes official website
 Mercedes Chamber of Commerce

Cities in Texas
Cities in Hidalgo County, Texas
Populated places established in 1907
1907 establishments in Texas